Tereza de Arriaga (Belém, Lisbon, 5 February 1915 – 12 August 2013) was a Portuguese painter. She started with plastic arts motivated by  Neorealism in the 1940s, developing into more abstract works of geometric character. At the end of the 1960s that her work became more consistent. Maintaining her social sensibility as an aspect of her plastic expression, she developed a deep exploration of colour and lines. Her works are simply signed as “Tereza Arriaga” or “Marriage”.

Early life and education
Tereza Arriaga, whose full name was Maria Thereza d' Almeida Pinheiro d' Arriaga, was the granddaughter of Manuel de Arriaga, the first President of the Portuguese Republic. She was born in the Belém Palace, because her father, Roque Manuel de Arriaga, was the personal assistant of the President and lived with his family in a rented part of the Palace. Due to the May 14 Revolt of 1915 which ended the presidential mandate, Arriaga had to leave the Palace under fire. When she was three, her mother died of the Spanish flu at age 27.

Arriaga was educated in a culturally privileged and political environment where republican ideas prevailed, which helped her understand social problems at an early age. Her childhood was spent in Monte Estoril, where she was educated by her father and also by an English tutoress and at the religious boarding school Colégio da Pena, in Sintra. As this style of education did not achieve results, the family returned to Lisbon where Tereza finished her primary education at the private Colégio Inglês, or English College.

Despite her father being a republican, her education tended towards the bourgeois ideal of the time: knowing how to write and read, how to play the piano and speak French. She tried to continue her piano studies, but by the end of her adolescence and she decided to prepare herself for the School of Arts. However, when she attended the studio of Raquel Roque Gameiro, the daughter of the watercolorist Alfredo Roque Gameiro, Raquel advised her to leave, saying what was taught and painted there would not satisfy Tereza at all.

She attended night school at the Sociedade Nacional de Belas-Artes (SNBA), where she was the only woman. She was taught by Frederico Aires, who lent her plaster busts from his own studio for Tereza to practice drawing. One year later, she enrolled in the School of Arts to take a painting course. There she met Jorge de Oliveira, whom she later married. By the end of the third year she decided to start working and suspended the course.

Career 
She lived in Pinhal de Leiria from 1944 to 1945, during which she taught drawing at the Industrial School of Marinha Grande. During this time she interacted with local workers, and went on to draw a series of drafts based on her interactions, called “Meninos operários” (Child workers). Many of them were drawn on packing paper. In this series she pictures the gestures and tired faces of the children wrinkled by dehydration while working in the nearby glass factories.

In 1952 she finished her Painting course with a thesis (an oil painting of large dimensions) called “Vidreiros” (glassmakers), based on her experience in Marinha Grande. Today it is housed at the Faculdade de Belas-Artes da Universidade de Lisboa (University of Lisbon).

From 1944 to 1985 she taught drawing at different schools, including the Escola de Artes Decorativas António Arroio.

Her only child was born in 1948, and this combined with her work as a teacher kept her painting career in the background for several years. Meanwhile, her husband Jorge de Oliveira participated in the emerging movements of Neorealism and Surrealism, and he was one of the pioneers of Geometric abstraction in Portugal.

However, her creative impulse was always present, and although she did not have a formal painting career Tereza still drew different drafts and projects, many of them on train or telephone tickets, which would later become developed sketches. In this long period she was also dedicated to watercolor painting, exploring her technical potential by making projects for oil canvas which would end up being used for the majority of her works. As Tereza Arriaga said: “oil is like digging the earth”. Watercolors provided her more liberty and speed in the moment of creation. In the 1950s and 1960s she dedicated herself mainly to portraits. Between 1951 and 1952, Tereza also focused on paintings with geometric atmosphere. In 1966 and 1967 she cooperated with the Sociedade Cooperativa de Gravadores Portugueses (Portuguese Engravers Cooperative Society), known as Cooperativa Gravura, participating in the exhibitions of the courses‘ end. At the end of the 1960s Arriaga began dedicating herself to painting, adopting the style which she maintained for the rest of her life.

Despite several drafts (such as a charcoal series on child workers with a neorealistic tendency) and more developed punctual creations, it was only in 1967 that Tereza Arriaga would become a more consistent and professional painter.

The author herself divided her studies into three series, which correspond to three periods: Bioburgos, Helioburgos and Biohélios. All of them are based on the search of an ideal of perfection and the expression of internal agitation. The dominant semiological element varies: the “bioburgos” are, according to the author, ourselves, town animals but biologic, that means they are inserted in a wider system as all the animal have towns. On the other hand, the element “helium” refers to the confrontation between the being and the light. The semiology of the vital elements is inserted in an emotional and intellectual search for cosmic connections between beings that are indefinite to conscience and thus can only be expressed by the threshold, i.e., by the ambiguity between dream and emotion, inside and outside, near and far, finding and losing. She expresses a reverential relationship to living elements without any sacrality. She prefers to call this type of relationship “comradeship”. Her paintings are, according to her own definition, “places to go”. Her plastic project explores, above all, the power of colour in relation to geometrical shapes, which melt in a conceptual and suggestive threshold.

Her work is mainly represented in the collection of the Museu do Chiado, as well as in institutional and private, national and foreign collections.

Political resistance
In Marinha Grande, moved by the tough reality she witnessed and motivated by the state of affairs after World War ll, as well as the development of political activities against the Salazar regime, she developed cultural and political initiatives between the 1940s and the 1950s.  These initiatives included working class clubs and associations, and conferences on women's rights, music or history, where she would take intellectuals and artists from Lisbon such as Fernando Lopes Graça, Maria Isabel Aboim Inglês or the historian Flausino Torres to industrial towns around the country.

During that same time, she became involved in antifascist movements and events, which culminated in her arrest by the PIDE and 110 days of imprisonment in the political prison of Caxias. This imprisonment would bring her several professional problems.

Bibliography
 Carmo, Fernando Infante (editor and preface): Aspectos das Artes Plásticas em Portugal, 1992 (it does not refer to the painter; reproduction of a painting and painter‘s photo)
 Dacosta, António: Dacosta em Paris – textos, Ed. Assírio e Alvim, s/d, p. 97.
 De Carvalho, Orlando M. P. N.: “Entrevistas a Tereza Arriaga e Jorge de Oliveira, 2005-2007”, documentation Centre of the Museu do Neo-Realismo, Vila Franca de Xira, 2007.
 Exposição Geral de Artes Plásticas, Catalogue, SNBA, July 1946.
 Gonçalves, Rui Mário: Colóquio Artes, nº 19, October 1994, pp. 31–37.
 Santos, Luiza: Tereza Arriaga – Pintura, in Exhibition catalogue 22/06 – 21/07, Câmara Municipal de Vila Franca de Xira, 2007.
 Tavares, Salette: Tereza Arriaga, in Exhibition catalogue in Galeria Diprove, Lisbon, April–May 1974.
 Tereza Arriaga, Helioburgos, Exhibition catalogue in Galeria Espiral, Oeiras.

References

1915 births
2013 deaths
20th-century Portuguese women artists
21st-century Portuguese women artists
Portuguese painters
People from Lisbon
Portuguese women painters